Eric I Abelsøn (died 27 May 1272) was a Danish nobleman. He was the ruling Duke of Schleswig from 1260 until his death in 1272. He was the second son of King Abel of Denmark, Duke of Schleswig and Mechtild of Holstein.

Early life
After the death of his elder brother Duke Valdemar III in 1257, Eric inherited the claim to the Duchy of Schleswig. However, his uncle and potential feudal overlord King Christopher I of Denmark refused to install him as duke.

Subsequently, Eric participated in the coalition of Bishop Peder Bang of Roskilde and Prince Jaromar II of Rugia against King Christopher. He took part in the military campaign of 1259 which resulted in the conquest of Copenhagen.

Duke of Schleswig
After the death of Christopher in 1259, he was created Duke of Schleswig by the new king Eric V in 1260.

Already the following year, fighting with the king broke out anew. The Queen Dowager, Margaret Sambiria, acting as regent for her under age son, feared aggression from the Duke. However, Duke Eric was able to defeat the royal army at the Battle of Lohede and capture the young King Eric and his mother. As a result, he was able to obtain huge advantages for his duchy at the subsequent treaty in 1264.

In 1268, he acquired Gottorp Castle from Bishop Bonde of Schleswig, who then moved his residence to Schwabstedt.

Duke Eric died 27 May 1272.

Marriage and issue
Eric married Margaret of Rugia, a daughter of Jaromar II, Prince of Rugia in 1259 or 1260. They had the following children:

 Margaret (died after 1313), married Helmold III, Count of Schwerin
 Valdemar IV, Duke of Schleswig (app. 1265–1312)
 Eric (Longbone), from 1295 Lord of Langeland (1272–1310), married Sophia Burghardsdatter (died 1325), daughter of Queen dowager Jutta of Denmark and Count Burchard VIII of Querfurt-Rosenburg, Burgrave of Magdeburg

Ancestry

Eric 01
1242 births
1272 deaths
Eric 01
Sons of kings